The Iowa Hawkeyes men's basketball team is part of the University of Iowa athletics department.

The Hawkeyes have played in 28 NCAA Tournaments, eight NIT Tournaments, won eight Big Ten regular-season conference championships and won the Big Ten tournament three times. Iowa has played in the Final Four on three occasions, reaching the semifinals in 1955 and 1980 and playing in the championship game against the University of San Francisco in 1956.

Iowa basketball was widely successful in the 1970s, 1980s, and 1990s with a program resurgence under Lute Olson and the tenures of George Raveling and Tom Davis. Under Olson, the Hawkeyes won their last Big Ten regular season championship and went to the 1980 Final Four.

They currently play in 15,400-seat Carver-Hawkeye Arena, along with Iowa women's basketball, wrestling, and volleyball teams.

Prior to playing in Carver-Hawkeye Arena, which opened in 1983, the Hawkeyes played in the Iowa Armory and the Iowa Field House, which is still used today by the school's gymnastics teams. In 2006, the Hawkeyes accumulated a school-record 21 consecutive wins at home before losing to in-state rival Northern Iowa.

Three Iowa head coaches have been inducted into the Naismith Basketball Hall of Fame as coaches: Sam Barry, Ralph Miller, and Lute Olson. A fourth Hawkeyes head coach, George Raveling, is a member in the Hall's contributor category.

History

Early years (1901–1922)
The roots of Iowa basketball lie in 1901, when Ed Rule coached the Hawkeyes to a 10–2 record in their very first season of varsity basketball. Earlier, when the sport was evolving and still in a club format, Iowa played the University of Chicago club in the first five-on-five college game on January 18, 1896. Rule coached the Hawkeyes in four non-consecutive seasons (1901–02, 03–04, 05–07), leading Iowa to a 37–15 record under his watch. Even today, Rule's winning percentage stands as the best among head coaches in Iowa basketball history.

Aside from Rule's tenure, the Hawkeyes were coached by: Fred Bailey (1902–1903), John Chalmers (1904–1905), John Griffith (1907–1910), Walter Stewart (1910–1912), Floyd Thomas (1912–1913), Maury Kent (1913–1918), Edwin Bannick (1918–1919), and James Ashmore (1919–1922). In the era of multiple sport coaches, Chalmers (24–8), Griffin (2–4), Kent (assistant) and Ashmore (assistant) also were Coaches of Iowa Hawkeyes football. Kent pitched briefly for the Brooklyn Dodgers and coached the Iowa Hawkeyes baseball team (42–26), as did Chalmers (24–6), Stewart (16–12), Ashmore (23–20) and Griffith (9–6). From 1902 to 1923, the best Iowa basketball finished in conference play was fifth on three separate occasions. Iowa began play in the Western Conference (1902–1917) which evolved and changed its name to the Big Ten Conference beginning in 1917–1918.

Sam Barry era (1922–1929)

In 1922, Sam Barry was hired as Iowa's 10th head coach. In Barry's first season, 1923, Iowa went 13–2 overall and won the Big Ten championship for the first time in school history. The winning did not stop there: the Hawkeyes also tied for the Big Ten championship in 1926, along with Indiana, Michigan, and Purdue. Barry also coached the Iowa Hawkeyes baseball team, going 19–15 from 1923 to 1924. Before Barry continued his Hall of Fame career at the USC in 1929, he authored a handbook on the sport, Basketball: Individual Play and Team Play, featuring Iowa players and facilities. 62–54 at Iowa, Barry remained at USC until his premature death in 1950 at age 57. Barry was inducted into the Naismith Basketball Hall of Fame in 1979.

Rollie Williams era (1929–1942) 

Following Barry in the line of Hawkeye coaches was Rollie Williams, who would coach Iowa on two occasions, from 1929 to 1942 and in 1951. Williams' winning percentage of 51.5% (139–131), and his long tenure at Iowa allowed him to become the winningest coach in Iowa history until Lute Olson, Tom Davis and Fran McCaffery surpassed him.

Early during Williams' head coaching tenure, in 1929, Iowa's teams were suspended from participation in the Big Ten for violating conference rules. After a Big Ten investigation uncovered an illegal slush fund and possible recruiting violations, Iowa relented to the Big Ten's demands and was eventually reinstated into the conference on February 1, 1930. Fourteen players, including four on the basketball squad, were declared ineligible as a result of the Big Ten's findings.

Nile Kinnick, the 1939 Heisman Trophy winner for Iowa Hawkeyes football, also played basketball at Iowa. Starting for Coach Williams in 1937–38 as a sophomore, Kinnick finished 2nd on the team and 15th in Big Ten scoring with 75 total points (6.3 points per game) that season, his only hoops season.

Williams left the Hawkeyes in 1942 during World War II to enter military service in the Navy. He would return to Iowa after his tour of duty and coached one final season in 1950–51, after illness had forced Pop Harrison away from the sideline the previous season.

Overall Williams had a 42-year tenure at the University of Iowa (1924 to 1966), working in various coaching capacities and moving into athletic administration at Iowa after his coaching career.

Pops Harrison era (1942–1950)

Just as the country emerged from the depression, so did Iowa's basketball fortunes. Following a rocky 7–10 season in 1943, Pops Harrison led the Hawkeyes to their third overall Big Ten title (and first unshared title) in 1945.

Murray Weir was the centerpiece of Pops Harrison's teams from 1944 to 1948, as Wier was a starter in all four-year season, playing under coach Harrison and developed into a prolific scorer, leading the NCAA in scoring. In 1944–45, the Hawkeyes won the Big Ten Conference season championship. The Hawkeyes finished second to the Michigan Wolverines in the Big Ten during Weir's his senior season of 1947–48.

Wier led the Hawkeyes in scoring in 1946–47 and 1947–48 with 15.1 and 21.0 points per game. Weir's 21.0 ppg led the NCAA in scoring in 1947–1948, with Wier becoming the first officially recognized Major College division scoring leader. Weir was a first team all–Big Ten selection and was selected as the Big Ten's Most Valuable Player. Weir was named a 1948 consensus first team All-American.

In the following decade, from 1946 to 1956, the Hawkeyes had but one non–winning season in 1948–49, Harrison's last full season as head coach. Illness forced Harrison miss a good portion of the 1949–50 season, coaching in 11 games.

Bucky O'Connor era (1949–1958)
After playing and graduating from Drake University, O'Connor first came to Iowa from Boone Junior College in Boone, Iowa. He began at Iowa as the freshman basketball coach and Head Golf Coach in 1948. In 1950, O'Connor took over after the first two coaches of the 1949–50 season stepped down. He became the official coach in the 1951–52 season. Following short tenures by O'Connor in 1950 and Rollie Williams (with O'Connor assisting) for the entire 1950–51 season, in subbing for the ill Pops Harrison, O'Connor became Iowa's permanent coach in 1951. O'Connor would hold that position and achieve great success, until his death on April 22, 1958.

Chuck Darling was an early prominent player under O'Connor. Darling was a Consensus first–team All-American in (1952), along with being named 1952 First–team All-Big Ten. Darling was the 1st Round pick (#8 overall) of the Rochester Royals in the 1952 NBA draft. He played instead for the AAU Phillips 66ers in order to remain an amateur. He later played in the 1956 Olympics.

The Fabulous Five / back to back Final Fours 
In 1952–53, Iowa finished second in the Big Ten behind the efforts of a starting lineup fully composed of sophomores nicknamed the "Fabulous Five:"Sharm Scheuerman, Bill Seaberg, Carl Cain, Bill Schoof, and Bill Logan.

As juniors in 1954–55, Iowa, with the "Fabulous Five" won the Big Ten outright and eventually finished fourth in the nation. Iowa advanced to the Final Four of the 1955 NCAA tournament, defeating the Penn State 82–53 and Marquette 86–81 to advance.

In 1955–56, as seniors, Iowa again won the Big Ten outright and advanced to the Final Four of the 1956 NCAA tournament. They defeated Morehead State 97–83 and Kentucky and Coach Adolph Rupp 89–77 to advance to the Final Four. There, they defeated Temple 83–76 to advance to the NCAA Championship game. In the NCAA Final, Iowa lost to the San Francisco Dons with Bill Russell 83–71. San Francisco ended the season undefeated.

Despite losing in the championship game, for the only time in school history, the Hawkeyes recorded consecutive Big Ten championships. Scheuerman, Seaberg, Cain, Schoof, and Logan, all members of the "Fabulous Five", had their jerseys retired in 1980.

1956 USA Basketball Olympians

Chuck Darling and Carl Cain were members of the 1956 United States men's Olympic basketball team that won the gold medal at the 1956 Melbourne Olympics. Hall of famers Bill Russell and KC Jones were fellow team members. Darling averaged 9.3 points per game in the Olympics.

O'Connor's death

On April 22, 1958, at the age of 44, O'Connor died in a car accident near Waterloo, Iowa, killed in a collision with a truck on Highway 218. O'Connor, who had once coached Iowa's Golf team, was on his way to Waterloo to play golf before a speaking engagement with the Sports of Sorts Club in Waterloo.

Includes Second Half of 1949–50 Season

Sharm Scheuerman era (1958–1964)
After graduating from Iowa, Scheuerman had been hired as an assistant coach under Bucky O'Connor. Scheuerman was hired as head coach in 1958 after O'Connor was killed. At age 24, Scheuerman became the youngest head basketball coach in Big Ten Conference history. In six years as the Hawkeyes' head coach, Scheuerman's teams compiled a record of 72–69. Bob King was an assistant under Scheuerman from 1960 to 1962. Scheuerman resigned after the 1963–1964 season and entered private business. He later became an announcer for Iowa telecasts.

A two-time All-American at Iowa, Naismith Basketball Hall of Fame Inductee and 5 x NBA Champion and Coach, Don Nelson, played for Iowa and Coach Scheuerman from 1959 to 1962. Nelson has the most wins as a coach in NBA history and his #19 is retired by the Boston Celtics.

Scheuerman recruited Naismith Hall of Fame player Connie Hawkins to Iowa in 1960. After enrolling at Iowa as a freshman, Hawkins was named in an investigation into gambling and point-shaving in his native New York City. Hawkins had borrowed and repaid $200 from former NBA player Jack Molinas and was questioned by the FBI without legal representation. He was banned and never played collegiately again, before embarking on a professional career. He eventually sued the NBA who had banned him, winning a $1.6 million settlement and reinstatement. Hawkins' #42 was retired by the Phoenix Suns.

Ralph Miller era (1964–1970) 

Iowa enjoyed 5 years of success under Ralph Miller from 1965 to 1966 through 1969–70, winning two Big Ten conference titles during that span. Miller joined the Hawks as head coach after completing a successful stint as head coach at Wichita State.

The 1967–68 team tied for the Big Ten Title with Ohio State with a 10–4 conference record, and a 16–9 overall record. This team was led by Sam Williams, a high-scoring forward who led the Big Ten in scoring that year.

The 1969–70 team was arguably the greatest team in Iowa basketball history. Known as the "Six-Pack" (because only 6 players played most of the minutes), this team stormed through the Big Ten with a perfect 14–0 record, one of the few Big Ten teams ever to go undefeated in the conference. The team averaged over 100 points in conference play, highlighted by a 108–107 victory in West Lafayette over Purdue late in the season to clinch the outright title. Rick Mount of Purdue scored 61 points in that game in a losing effort.

The Six-Pack team was led by John Johnson and "Downtown" Fred Brown, who both enjoyed long and successful NBA careers after playing for the Hawkeyes,  Johnson was the 1st round pick (#7) overall of the Cleveland Cavaliers in the 1970 NBA draft. Glenn "the Stick" Vidnovic and Chad Calabria also were Six-pack members. Iowa averaged almost 80% accuracy as a team from the free throw line for the season.

Miller left Iowa after the 1969–70 season to accept the head coaching job at Oregon State, where he coached until 1989. Miller was inducted into the Naismith Basketball Hall of Fame in 1998.

Dick Schultz era (1970–1974)
Miller and Scheuerman's assistant (and Iowa's baseball coach), Dick Schultz, succeeded Miller as head coach in 1970. A dual coach, Schultz had previously coached the Iowa Hawkeyes baseball team, going 129–106 from 1963 to 1970. Schultz was 41–55 overall during his four-year run as coach, with "Downtown" Freddie Brown and Kevin Kunnert becoming First Round NBA Draft Picks.

Brown was the 1st round pick (#6 overall) of the Seattle SuperSonics in the 1971 NBA draft and Kunnert was the 1st round pick (#12 overall) of the Chicago Bulls in 1973 NBA draft.

Schultz resigned in 1974, after four second-division finishes in the Big Ten and a 41–55 overall record. Schultz later became the executive director of the National Collegiate Athletic Association (NCAA) from 1988 to 1993. He then became executive director of the United States Olympic Committee (USOC) from 1995 to 2000.

Lute Olson era (1974–1983)
Iowa hired Long Beach State coach Lute Olson to replace Schultz in 1974. After progressive improvements from 1975 to 1977, Olson coached the Hawkeyes to five consecutive NCAA Tournament appearances from 1979 to 1983. 
The 1978–79 squad earned a share the Big Ten Title.

1980 Final Four
Olson's tenure was highlighted by an appearance in the Final Four in 1980 on a team led by Ronnie Lester, with a supporting cast of Kenny Arnold, Steve Waite, Steve Krafcisin, Vince Brookins, Kevin Boyle, Bobby Hanson, and Mark Gannon. Iowa started 7–0 on the season when Lester was injured early in the season at Dayton, not returning until the regular season finale.

Nineteen regular season wins earned Iowa a No. 5 seed in the East Regional of the NCAA Tournament (then, a 48-team field). In the four tournament wins that took Iowa to the Final Four, All-American Lester dished out 26 assists while committing only seven turnovers along with 51 points. Iowa opened by defeating Virginia Commonwealth 86–72 and No. 4 seed NC State 77–64. In a huge upset, Iowa knocked off No. 1 seed Syracuse 88–77, setting up a matchup in the Elite Eight with No. 3 Georgetown. Iowa earned an improbable Final Four trip to Indianapolis on March 16, 1980, defeating John Thompson's Georgetown squad 81–80. Iowa overcame a 10-point halftime deficit, making 17 of their final 21 shots and going 15–15 from the free-throw line. The winning basket was Steve Waite's three-point play in the closing seconds.

In the semi-final game against Denny Crum's Louisville team, Lester scored the first 10 points for Iowa. But after eight minutes of play he reinjured his knee and exited the game, ending his Iowa career. In Lester's absence, Louisville bested Iowa by only eight points, 80–72 and went on to win the Tournament, defeating UCLA, led by Larry Brown, in the final. Lester's value to his team was evident in the numbers. Not counting the Louisville game, they were 15–1 with Lester and 8–9 without him. Hall of Famer Earvin "Magic" Johnson, who played two seasons at Michigan State, once claimed Lester the toughest opponent he ever faced in the Big Ten. Lester was drafted 10th overall in the 1980 NBA draft, but the knee issues limited him in the NBA. He donated $100,000 to the University of Iowa in 2009.

Career at Iowa

After Olson coached the Hawkeyes to the 1980 Final Four, Iowa made the next three NCAA Tournaments. They advanced to the Sweet Sixteen in the 1983 NCAA tournament, his final season at Iowa. Then nicknamed "The House That Lute Built", Carver-Hawkeye Arena opened on January 5, 1983, replacing the Iowa Field House. After the 1982–1983 season, Olson left Iowa for the University of Arizona. Olson was inducted into the Naismith Basketball Hall of Fame in 2002.

George Raveling era (1983–1986)
When Lute Olson left for Arizona, George Raveling came to Iowa from Washington State, where he coached from 1972 to 1983. Raveling immediately recruited Michigan high school stars B. J. Armstrong, Bill Jones, and Roy Marble, Springfield, Illinois' Lanphier High School teammates Ed Horton and Kevin Gamble, as well as USC transfer Gerry Wright, and Les Jepsen, all of whom would go on to play in the NBA. During Raveling's three years with the Iowa program, the Hawkeyes made two trips to the NCAA Tournament, after his first Iowa team finished 13–15. Like Sam Barry decades before, Raveling left Iowa (after the 1985–86 season) to take the head coaching position at the University of Southern California after compiling a record of 55–38 at Iowa. Raveling was inducted into the Naismith Basketball Hall of Fame in 2015.

Tom Davis era (1986–1999)
Dr. Tom Davis was hired after George Raveling departed. Davis coached the Hawkeyes for 13 seasons from 1986–87 to 1998–99. Davis had coached Lafayette (1971–1977), Boston College (1977–1982) and Stanford (1982–1986) prior to Iowa. Davis is Iowa's all time victory leader with 269 wins.

Davis utilized a full court press defense and rapid continuous substitution. In 1986–1987, the Hawkeyes won their first 18 games and obtained the No. 1 ranking in the AP and UPI polls for the first time in school history. Iowa, with future NBA players Brad Lohaus, B. J. Armstrong, Ed Horton, Kevin Gamble, Bill Jones and Roy Marble, along with Jeff Moe won a school-record 30 games. Iowa finished 14–4 in the Big Ten and advanced to the Elite Eight of the NCAA tournament.

In the 1987 NCAA tournament #2 seed Iowa defeated Santa Clara 96–76, UTEP 84–82 and Oklahoma 93–91 to advance to the Elite Eight. In the Western Regional Final Iowa lost to #1 seed UNLV 84–81 after having a 16-point halftime lead. Kevin Gamble, who had hit the winning shot against the University of Oklahoma to send the Hawkeyes to the Elite Eight, shot a 3–pointer as time expired, but the shot bounced off the rim.

Retaining B. J. Armstrong, Ed Horton, Bill Jones and Roy Marble, the Hawkeyes began the 1987–88 season ranked in the top five by most polls and publications. Iowa advanced to the Sweet Sixteen, avenging their loss to UNLV in the Second Round 106–89, before losing 99–79 to former coach Lute Olson's Arizona Wildcats.

On January 16, 1993, Iowa player Chris Street, a junior averaging 14.5 points and 9.5 rebounds on Iowa's 12–2 team, was killed in an accident with a snow plow in Iowa City. His # 40 was retired by Iowa.

In all, Davis led the Hawkeyes to nine NCAA Tournaments, winning every First Round game in the process. In his final season, Iowa advanced to the Sweet Sixteen before losing to eventual National Champion UConn. Under Davis the Hawkeyes also made two appearances in the National Invitational Tournament. He is the all–time winningest coach in Iowa history with 269 wins. He would later come out of retirement to rebuild the Drake University program before being succeeded at Drake by his son Keno Davis.

Steve Alford era (1999–2007)
Steve Alford, a former All-American as an Indiana Hoosier and a member of the Olympic gold-winning 1984 United States basketball team, arrived at Iowa after coaching Southwest Missouri State University to the 1999 NCAA Tournament Sweet 16. In his first game as coach of the Hawkeyes, Iowa defeated the defending national champion and No. 1-ranked Connecticut Huskies in Madison Square Garden. Iowa finished 14–16.

During his second year (2000–01) the Hawkeyes' roster included Indiana transfer Luke Recker and Reggie Evans, who would lead the Big Ten Conference in rebounds and double-doubles during his two seasons with Iowa, as well as Iowa Mr. basketball 1997 Dean Oliver. However, after a knee injury sidelined Recker, the Hawkeyes dropped six of their last seven conference games, finishing 23–12 for the regular season and 7–9 in the Big Ten Conference regular season. Despite the setback, they battled back and won the Big Ten Conference tournament with four straight wins against Northwestern, Ohio State, Penn State, and Indiana. This earned them a #7 seed in the 2001 NCAA tournament, where they defeated Creighton in the first round but lost to Kentucky in the second round.

The Hawkeyes' conference record dropped to 5–11 during the 2001–02 season, but they defeated Purdue, Wisconsin, and Indiana in the Big Ten tournament before losing to Ohio State in the finals. The Hawkeyes played in the 2002 National Invitation Tournament, losing to LSU in the first round to finish with a 19–16 record. This was the first of three straight seasons that the Hawkeyes played in the NIT under Alford.

Iowa won the first two rounds of the 2003 tournament against Valparaiso and Iowa State before losing to Georgia Tech, finishing with a 17–14 record. In 2004, they returned to the NIT, losing to St. Louis in the first round to complete the season at 16–13. Their 9–7 conference record marked the first winning Big Ten Conference record under Alford.

The Hawkeyes finished 21–12 with a 7–9 conference record in the 2004–05 regular season. They won their first two Big Ten tournament games against Purdue and Michigan State before losing the third game to Wisconsin, 59–56. They earned an at-large invitation to the 2005 NCAA tournament as a #10 seed, where they lost 76–64 to Cincinnati in the first round. During the season, leading scorer Pierre Pierce was dismissed from the team amid charges of sexual abuse; Pierce ultimately served one year in prison.

During the 2005–06 season, the Hawkeyes went undefeated at Carver-Hawkeye Arena for the first time in school history and finished in a second-place tie with Illinois with an 11–5 conference record, one game behind Ohio State. However, the Hawkeyes defeated Minnesota, Michigan State, and Ohio State to win the Big Ten tournament and finish 25–8 going into its third NCAA Tournament under Alford. They were ranked No. 11 nationally and seeded #3 in the Atlanta Regional of the 2006 NCAA tournament, but lost in a first-round upset to #14 seed Northwestern State 64–63, leaving Alford with only one NCAA Tournament win since taking over at Iowa. The game was lost on a last-second shot, and the Hawkeyes would not return to the Round of 64 in the NCAA Tournament until 2014–15.

During the 2006–07 season, Alford led the Hawkeyes to an 8–6 non-conference record (which included a home loss to Drake for the first time in 40 years) and a 9–7 record in the Big Ten Conference. Iowa was not invited to the post-season, marking the first time since the 1976–77 season that a Hawkeye team with a winning record (17–14) failed to make either the NCAA Tournament or the NIT.

At the conclusion of the 2006–07 season, Alford resigned from the University of Iowa to accept the coaching position at the University of New Mexico.

Todd Lickliter era (2007–2010) 

Following Alford's departure, Butler coach and reigning NABC Coach of the Year Todd Lickliter was hired. The graduation of Adam Haluska and the transfer of leading scorer Tyler Smith to Tennessee created a void. The 2007–2008 Hawkeyes would finish 13–19 for the season, including 6–12 in the Big Ten. The 2008–09 Hawkeyes would improve slightly to 15–17. The 2009–10 Hawkeyes dropped to 10–22. After experiencing the worst three-year run in the program's history, Lickliter was fired on March 15, 2010.

Fran McCaffery era (2010–present) 
Coach Fran McCaffery came to Iowa from Siena in 2010. In his 23rd season as a head coach at Iowa, Lehigh (1985–1988), UNC-Greensboro (1999–2005) and Siena (2005–2010), McCaffery has a career record of 424–308 (.583).

Iowa's attendance increased by 20 percent from the previous year. McCaffery guided Iowa to two victories over top–50 RPI teams, including sixth–ranked Purdue.

In 2012 the Hawkeyes were 4–3 against teams ranked in the AP top 25. For the second consecutive year, the Iowa Men's Basketball program saw a marked uptick in attendance inside Carver-Hawkeye Arena. Iowa's average attendance for all home games for the 2011–12 season was 11,841, the conference-only attendance was 13,254 per game.

During the 2012–2013 season Iowa finished the regular season with a 20–11 record, including an 11–2 non conference and 9–9 conference record. Coach McCaffery also earned his 300th career win as a head coach on March 9, 2013, with a 74–60 win over Nebraska. In postseason play they defeated Northwestern in the Big Ten tournament before falling to the #3 seeded Michigan State Spartans in the second round. The Hawkeyes went on to earn a #3 seed in the 2013 NIT tournament where they would go advance to the championship game for the first time in school history before losing to Baylor (74–54). Iowa's 25 win total was the most by the team since setting the same mark in the 2005–2006 season.

During the 2013–2014 season, Iowa achieved a non-conference record of 11–2, including a runner-up finish in the 2013 Battle 4 Atlantis tournament and a loss to in–state rival Iowa State. The Hawkeyes finished the Big Ten Conference season with a 9–9 record and a regular season record of 20–12. The Hawkeyes were seeded sixth in the Big Ten Conference tournament but lost to No. 11-seeded Northwestern 67–62, a team that the Hawkeyes had twice beaten by 26 points in two conference season games. The Hawkeyes played in the 'first four' during the 2014 NCAA Division I men's basketball tournament, playing Tennessee in the first round of the 2014 NCAA Division I men's basketball tournament.  This was their first NCAA Tournament appearance since the 2005–2006 season.

The 2014–2015 Hawkeyes finished their non–conference schedule 9–4, with losses to #10 Texas (71–57) and #23 Syracuse (66–63) in the 2K Classic. Additional non-conference losses came at the hands of rivals #14 Iowa State (90–75) and UNI (56–44). McCaffery led Iowa to a 12–6 record in the Big Ten, including memorable wins over #20 Ohio State (71–65) and #17 Maryland (71–55). McCaffrey's Hawkeyes were upset in the second round of the Big Ten tournament by Penn State (67–58), but still finished tied for third in the conference. Iowa earned a 7th seed in the NCAA Tournament and beat Davidson (83–52) in the Round of 64 before bowing out to Gonzaga (87–68) in the third round. McCaffery's Hawkeyes finished 22–12 on the year.

During the 2015–16 season, the University of Iowa reached a new peak during the McCaffery era, twice defeating Michigan State during the regular season, attaining a 19–4 overall record and a No. 3 Associated Press rankings. However, the Hawkeyes lost seven of their last 10 games, including a 68–66 loss to 12th-seeded Illinois in the second round of the Big Ten Conference tournament, a team the Hawkeyes had defeated handily a month earlier and would not play in the post–season. As a result of the late–season swoon, the Hawkeyes fell to No. 25 in the final Associated Press rankings. Seeded seventh in the NCAA Division I tournament's South regional, the Hawkeyes used a buzzer-beating tip-in to defeat Temple 72–70 in overtime. The Hawkeyes lost to second–seeded Villanova in the second round, 87–68, to end the season 22–11.

After the 2015–16 season graduated 4 senior starters, Iowa got off to a rocky start to the 2016–17 campaign, going 3–5 with losses to Seton Hall (91–83), Virginia (74–41), Memphis (100–92), Notre Dame (92–78), and Nebraska–Omaha (98–89). The Hawkeyes turned things around in December and ended non-conference play with five straight victories, including wins over in-state rivals #25 Iowa State (78–64) and UNI (69–46). Iowa finished non-conference play 8–5 on the year. The Hawkeyes went 10–8 in conference play, with wins over Michigan (86–83), #17 Purdue (83–78), Ohio State (85–72), #24 Maryland (83–69), Indiana (96–90), and #22 Wisconsin (59–57). McCaffery's Hawkeyes were invited to the NIT post-season tournament and defeated South Dakota (87–75) before losing in overtime to eventual champion TCU (94–92), finishing their season 19–15. Senior Peter Jok lead the Big Ten in scoring (19.9 ppg) and was first-team all–conference.

The 2017–18 season was a disaster for the Hawkeyes. After losing the Big Ten leading scorer, Peter Jok, a young Iowa team struggled to find their identity. Coach McCaffery's eldest son, Connor, joined the team as an ESPN four–star recruit out of local Iowa City West, but battled a series of ailments, including mononucleosis, which lead to being granted a medical redshirt year. Iowa finished the season 14–19, 4–14 in Big Ten play in a three-way tie for 11th place. As the No. 12 seed in the Big Ten tournament, they defeated Illinois before losing to Michigan in the second round.

In 2018–19 a young Iowa team won the 2K Sports Classic early in the season, defeating #13 Oregon (77–69) and UCONN (91–72) in back–to–back nights at Madison Square Garden. The Hawkeyes would go undefeated in non–conference play, with wins over in–state rivals Iowa State (98–84) and UNI (77–54). They also scored a whopping 68 points in the first half of a 105–78 win over Alabama State and beat Savannah State by 46 (110–64). Iowa's season featured several thrilling contests, including a 1-point victory over Pitt (69–68), and buzzer-beating wins in back–to–back games against Northwestern (80–79) and Rutgers (71–69). Iowa just missed a chance to make it three last–second victories in a row, but a shot as time expired rimmed out against #24 Maryland (66–65). Other notable regular season victories for Iowa included wins over #24 Nebraska (93–84), #16 Ohio State (72–62), and #5 Michigan (74–59). The Hawkeyes ended the regular season on a 4–game losing streak. In the Big Ten tournament, Iowa defeated Illinois before falling to Michigan. The Hawkeyes earned the No. 10 seed in the South Regional in the NCAA Tournament. In the first round, the Hawkeyes came from behind to upset seventh-seed Cincinnati (79–72). Then, Iowa faced off against second seed Tennessee in the Round of 32. The Hawkeyes came back from a 25-point deficit in the first half to send the game to overtime, which was won by Tennessee.

The 2019–20 season saw Iowa complete a 9–2 non-conference schedule with notable wins over rival Iowa State (84–68), and #12 ranked Texas Tech (72–61). The Iowa squad was led by standout center Luka Garza, who averaged 23.9 points and 9.8 rebounds en route to numerous accolades. Garza would go on to win the Big Ten Player of the Year, Sporting News Men's College Basketball Player of the Year, Pete Newell Big Man Award, Kareem Abdul-Jabbar Award, and consensus All-American honors while leading the Hawkeyes to a 20–11 record that featured conference wins over #12 Maryland (67–49), #19 Michigan (90–83), #24 Rutgers (85–80), #19 Illinois (72–65), #25 Ohio State (85–76), and #16 Penn State (77–68). The 2019–20 season ended abruptly with the outbreak of the COVID-19 coronavirus without a postseason being played. McCaffery's younger son, Patrick, another ESPN four–star recruit, joined the team as a freshman but took a medical redshirt while recovering from the residual effects thyroid cancer treatment.

Iowa basketball coaches

The Hawkeyes have had 22 coaches in their 118-year history. Fran McCaffery is the current Iowa coach. Two coaches have been named Big Ten Conference Coach-of-the-Year since it officially began in 1975: Lute Olson in 1979 and Tom Davis in 1987. Four Iowa coaches have been inducted into the Naismith Basketball Hall of Fame: Sam Barry, Ralph Miller, Lute Olson and George Raveling.

Head-to-head Big Ten records since 1949–50
Note: Through 2020–21 season
Source: Iowa Hawkeyes Head-to-Head Results

Postseason

NCAA tournament results
The Hawkeyes have appeared in the NCAA tournament 28 times. Their combined record is 31–31.

*Following the introduction of the "First Four" round in 2011, the Round of 64 and Round of 32 were referred to as the Second Round and Third Round, respectively, from 2011 to 2015. Then from 2016 moving forward, the Round 64 and Round of 32 will be called the First and Second rounds, as they were prior to 2011.

Historical NCAA tournament seeding
The NCAA began seeding the tournament with the 1979 edition.

NIT results
The Hawkeyes have appeared in the National Invitation Tournament (NIT) eight times. Their combined record is 10–8.

Individual honors

Retired numbers

The following Hawkeye players have had their numbers retired by the University of Iowa; the number 46, retired to honor Sharm Scheuerman, is currently prohibited from use under NCAA rules.

Honored jerseys 
The jersey was retired but the number is still active for use.

All-American selections 

Each year, numerous publications and organizations release lists of All-America teams, hypothetical rosters of players considered the best in the nation at their respective positions. The National Collegiate Athletic Association (NCAA) uses officially recognized All-America selectors to determine the consensus selections. Over time, the sources used to determine the consensus selections have varied. Currently, the NCAA uses four "major" selectors to determine consensus All-Americans: the Associated Press, The National Association of Basketball Coaches, the United States Basketball Writers Association and Sporting News magazine.  Since 1984, the NCAA has applied a standardized point system to those teams designated as "major" All-American teams to determine consensus teams.  The point system consists of three points for first team, two points for second team and one point for third team. No honorable mention or fourth team or lower are used in the computation.  The top five totals plus ties are first team and the next five plus ties are second team. Many other publications and organization compile their own "minor" All-America teams in addition to the selectors listed here.

Through the 2022 season, 15 Iowa players have earned 20 All-America selections.  Of Iowa's 20 All-Americans, 7 were first-team All-American selections – all 7 were consensus first team selections; they are listed in bold in the table below.

Big Ten honorees

Big Ten Most Valuable Players

The Chicago Tribune Silver Basketball was awarded from 1946 to 2007 by the Chicago Tribune to the college basketball player determined to be the Most Valuable Player of the Big Ten Conference. Three Hawkeyes won the Big Ten MVP award:

Big Ten Players of the Year

Since 1985, the Big Ten Conference has named the Big Ten Conference Men's Basketball Player of the Year. The Hawkeyes' first recipient of this award was Luka Garza, who was so honored in both 2020 and 2021.

Big Ten Conference tournament Most Valuable Players

Since 1998, the Big Ten Conference has held an annual basketball tournament at the end of its regular season.  Every year, the Big Ten Conference men's basketball tournament crowns a tournament MVP, and three Hawkeyes have won the annual honor:

Other annual awards

Coaches and media of the Big Ten also make annual selections for additional individual honors:

All-conference selections

Through the 2022 season, Iowa has had 117 All-Big Ten selections, including 38 first-team selections.  34 players were multiple All-Big Ten selections, and nine players were three-time All-Big Ten selections.

Team awards

Most Valuable Players 
The Iowa Most Valuable Player Award was presented annually to an Iowa player or players from 1946 to 2007:

Chris Street Award 

The Chris Street Award, named in honor of former Hawkeye Chris Street, has been presented annually since 1993 to “a Hawkeye player who best exemplifies the spirit, enthusiasm, and intensity of Chris Street”:

Hawkeyes inducted into the Naismith Basketball Hall of Fame 
* Did not play varsity basketball at Iowa

Iowa Hawkeye Olympians

Hawkeyes in the NBA 
Source: NBA & ABA Players Who Played For Iowa

Hawkeyes in international basketball
 Devyn Marble (born 1992), basketball player for Maccabi Haifa of the Israeli Basketball Premier League

Facilities 

Iowa's men's basketball team plays their home games at Carver–Hawkeye Arena, a 15,500-seat multi-purpose indoor arena located in Iowa City, Iowa.  It opened in 1983 and is also the home of the university's wrestling, women's basketball, and volleyball teams.

Prior to playing in Carver-Hawkeye Arena, the Hawkeye men's basketball team played in Close Hall (1902–1905) and then the first Iowa Armory (1905–1922), which was located where the UI Communications Center building currently sits, across the street from the Library on the East Side of the Iowa River. Iowa moved to the second Iowa Armory (1922–1926), and then to the Iowa Field House (1926–1982), which was built directly beside the second Iowa Armory, which was incorporated into the Field House. The Iowa Field House is still used today for classrooms, offices and as home to Iowa gymnastics teams.

Arenas

University of Iowa Athletics Hall of Fame
The following Iowa men's basketball players/coaches have been inducted into the University of Iowa Athletics Hall of Fame. Some were inducted as players in multiple sports where noted:

Players, Inducted:

Fred Brown, 2006
Carl Cain, 1989
Chuck Darling, Basketball, Track and Field, 1990
Aubrey Devine, Football, Basketball, Track and Field, 1989
Jack Dittmer, Football, Baseball, Basketball, 1993
Dick Ives, Basketball, Baseball, 2000
John Johnson, Basketball, 1994
Nile Kinnick, Football, Basketball, 1989
Ronnie Lester, 1995
Bill Logan, 1991
Don Nelson, 1989
Erwin Prasse, Football, Basketball, Baseball, 1989
Walter “Stub” Stewart, Football, Basketball, Baseball, 2000
Murray Wier, 1989
Herb Wilkinson, Basketball, Track and Field, 1999
Samuel Clyde Williams, Football, Baseball, Track and Field, 1993
Sam Williams, 2003
Coaches:
Tom Davis, 2008
Lawrence “Pops” Harrison, 1999
Ralph Miller, 1995
Bucky O'Connor, Basketball, Golf, 1990
Lute Olson, 2000

See also 
 University of Iowa Athletics Hall of Fame
 NCAA Men's Division I Final Four appearances by coaches

References

External links